Pascal Portes (born 28 May 1959) is a former professional tennis player from France. During his career, he won two doubles titles. He achieved a career-high singles ranking of World No. 44 in 1981 and a career-high doubles ranking of World No. 118 in 1984.

Portes was a member of the French Davis Cup team in 1979, 1980, 1981, and 1984.

ATP finals

Singles runners-up (2)

Doubles titles (2)

References

External links
 
 

French male tennis players
1959 births
Living people
Sportspeople from Lot-et-Garonne